Matthew Shum is an American economist. He is the William D. Hacker Professor of Economics at the California Institute of Technology.

Biography 
Shum received his B.A. from Columbia University in 1992, and his Ph.D. from Stanford University in 1996. He taught at the University of Toronto from 1998 to 2000 before moving to the faculty of Johns Hopkins University, where he taught until 2008. He began teaching at Caltech in 2008 and was the J. Stanley Johnson Professor of Economics from 2016 to 2022.

Shum's research lies at the intersection between econometrics and the study of industrial organizations that involves applying statistical modeling to consumer and firm-level datasets. He was elected a fellow of the Econometric Society in 2021.

References 

Living people
Columbia College (New York) alumni
Stanford University alumni
Academic staff of the University of Toronto
Johns Hopkins University faculty
California Institute of Technology faculty
Fellows of the Econometric Society
American economists
Econometricians
Year of birth missing (living people)